Taung is a small town situated in the North West Province of South Africa. The name means place of the lion and was named after Tau, the King of the Barolong. Tau is the Tswana word for lion.

Education 
High,Secondary and Middle Schools in Taung include:
PH Moeketsi Agricultural High School
Pinagare High School 
Mankuroane Technical and Commercial Secondary School
Thabasikwa High School
Kgosietsile Lethola High School 
Pudumong High School
Bogosing High School
Leshobo High School
Reekekathata Secondary School 
Batlhaping High School 
St Paul's High Schools
Mokgareng High Schools
Sekate Boijane Mahura High School 
Maatla High School 
Marubising High School 
Thate Molatlhwa Secondary School 
Gabodiwe High School 
Choseng Secondary School 
Joseph Saku Secondary School 
Thakung High School
Jerry Secondary School 
Walter Letsie High School
Kabinelang Secondary School
Mothelesi Secondary School
Reivilo High School 
Seoleseng Secondary School 
Gabobediwe Secondary School 
Thapama Secondary School 
Kebinelang Secondary School 
Tselayathuto Secondary School 
Totonyane Secondary School 
Mammutla Secondary School 
Motsemme Secondary School 
Leshobo High School 
Pudumong Secondary School 
Thusoetsile Secondary School 
Thakung Secondary School
Reemekathatha Secondary School 
Seabo Secondary School

Primary Schools in Taung include:

Seile Primary School
Seoposengwe Primary School
Mokasa Primary School
Lokgabeng Primary School
Goitseone Mankuroane Primary School

Taung skull fossil site

In 1924, a skull (later named the Taung Child) was discovered by a quarry-worker in the nearby Buxton-limestone quarry. It was described by Raymond Dart in 1925 as the type specimen of Australopithecus africanus after he received a shipment of mostly fossil baboons, but also containing the skull and face of the child. Surprisingly, it would be many years before Dart would visit Taung to determine the exact location of the find.  By that time, lime-mining had destroyed much of the area. Later in-situ excavations were conducted under the direction of Phillip Tobias and Jeffrey McKee  of the University of the Witwatersrand, who worked at the site from approximately 1989 until 1993. Although they failed to find additional hominid specimens, they did recover many important fossil baboons and increased the  understanding of the Taung geology and taphonomy significantly.

Unlike the dolomitic caves near Johannesburg, South Africa and the site of Makapansgat, the Taung fossil sites are found in caves formed in a gigantic tufa flow coming off the dolomitic bedrock of the Kalahari escarpment.

The Taung Child is among the most important early human fossils ever discovered. It was the first hominid to be discovered in Africa, a species later named Australopithecus africanus, supporting Charles Darwin's concepts that the closest living relatives of humans are the African apes. It furthermore demonstrated significant differences between reality and the fake skull of a proposed human ancestor from England known as the Piltdown Man or Eoanthropus. The little skull is hypothesized to be from an approximately three to three and a half year old child.  The cast of the brain is preserved by the filling of the skull with limestone breccia. The skull is housed at the University of the Witwatersrand in Johannesburg, South Africa.

The Taung Child was at first proposed to have been killed by other hominids as part of Raymond Dart's Osteo-Dento-Keratic Culture hypothesis.  However, later work by C.K. "Bob" Brain demonstrated that the child was probably killed by some sort of mammalian carnivore such as a leopard.  Recently, however, studies of the associated baboons by Ron Clarke and Lee Berger, and identification of specific marks on the Taung Child skull have demonstrated that the Taung Child may have been killed and eaten by a large bird of prey.

See also
Hominids
Cradle of Humankind
List of human evolution fossils
North West Cultural Calabash

References

Sources
P.V. Tobias, Dart Taung and the Missing Link (Inst. for the Study of Man in Africa, 1984)
L.R. Berger and B. Hilton-Barber, In the Footsteps of Eve (National Geographic Press, 2001)
L.R. Berger and B. Hilton-Barber, Field Guide to the Cradle of Humankind (Struik, 2001)
L.R. Berger Am. J.Phys. Anth. 131:166-168 (2006)

Archaeological sites in South Africa
Pliocene paleontological sites of Africa
Caves of South Africa
Limestone caves
Landforms of North West (South African province)
Populated places in the Greater Taung Local Municipality
Paleoanthropological sites
Archaeological sites of Southern Africa